Benzo[a]pyrene (BaP or B[a]P) is a polycyclic aromatic hydrocarbon and the result of incomplete combustion of organic matter at temperatures between  and . The ubiquitous compound can be found in coal tar, tobacco smoke and many foods, especially grilled meats. The substance with the formula C20H12 is one of the benzopyrenes, formed by a benzene ring fused to pyrene. Its diol epoxide metabolites (more commonly known as BPDE) react with and bind to DNA, resulting in mutations and eventually cancer. It is listed as a Group 1 carcinogen by the IARC. In the 18th century a scrotal cancer of chimney sweepers, the chimney sweeps' carcinoma, was already known to be connected to soot.

Description 
Benzo[a]pyrene (BaP) is a polycyclic aromatic hydrocarbon found in coal tar with the formula C20H12.

Sources 
The main source of atmospheric BaP is residential wood burning. It is also found in coal tar, in automobile exhaust fumes (especially from diesel engines), in all smoke resulting from the combustion of organic material (including cigarette smoke), and in charbroiled food.
A 2001 National Cancer Institute study found levels of BaP to be significantly higher in foods that were cooked well-done on the barbecue, particularly steaks, chicken with skin, and hamburgers: Cooked meat products have been shown to contain up to 4 ng/g of BaP, and up to 5.5 ng/g in fried chicken and 62.6 ng/g in overcooked charcoal barbecued beef.

BaP is discharged in wastewater by industries such as smelters, particularly iron and steel mills and aluminum smelters.

History 
In the 18th century, young British chimney sweeps who climbed into chimneys suffered from chimney sweeps' carcinoma, a scrotal cancer peculiar to their profession, and this was connected to the effects of soot in 1775, in the first work of occupational cancer epidemiology and also the first connection of any chemical mixture to cancer formation. Frequent skin cancers were noted among fuel industry workers in the 19th century. In 1933, BaP was determined to be the compound responsible for these cases, and its carcinogenicity was demonstrated when skin tumors occurred in laboratory animals repeatedly painted with coal tar. BaP has since been identified as a prime carcinogen in cigarette smoke.

Toxicity

Nervous system 
Prenatal exposure of BaP in rats is known to affect learning and memory in rodent models. Pregnant rats eating BaP were shown to negatively affect the brain function in the late life of their offspring. At a time when synapses are first formed and adjusted in strength by activity, BaP diminished NMDA receptor-dependent nerve cell activity measured as mRNA expression of the NMDA NR2B receptor subunit.

Immune system 
BaP has an effect on the number of white blood cells, inhibiting some of them from differentiating into macrophages, the body's first line of defense to fight infections. In 2016, the molecular mechanism was uncovered as damage to the macrophage membrane's lipid raft integrity by decreasing membrane cholesterol at 25%. This means less immunoreceptors CD32 (a member of the Fc family of immunoreceptors) could bind to IgG and turn the white blood cell into a macrophage. Therefore, macrophage membranes become susceptible to bacterial infections.

Reproductive system 
In experiments with male rats, sub-chronic exposure to inhaled BaP has been shown to generally reduce the function of testicles and epididymis with lower sex steroid/testosterone production and sperm production.

Carcinogenicity 
BaP's metabolites are mutagenic and highly carcinogenic, and it is listed as a Group 1 carcinogen by the IARC. Chemical agents and related occupations, Volume 10, A review of Human Carcinogens, IARC Monographs, Lyon France 2009 

In June 2016, BaP was added as benzo[def]chrysene to the REACH Candidate List of Substances of very high concern for Authorisation.

Numerous studies since the 1970s have documented links between BaP and cancers. It has been more difficult to link cancers to specific BaP sources, especially in humans, and difficult to quantify risks posed by various methods of exposure (inhalation or ingestion). A link between vitamin A deficiency and emphysema in smokers was described in 2005 to be due to BaP, which induces vitamin A deficiency in rats.

A 1996 study provided molecular evidence linking components in tobacco smoke to lung cancer. BaP was shown to cause genetic damage in lung cells that was identical to the damage observed in the DNA of most malignant lung tumours.

Regular consumption of cooked meats has been epidemiologically associated with increased levels of colon cancer (although this in itself does not prove carcinogenicity),
A 2005 NCI study found an increased risk of colorectal adenomas was associated with BaP intake, and more strongly with BaP intake from all foods. However, the foods themselves are not necessarily carcinogenic, even if they contain trace amounts of carcinogens, because the gastrointestinal tract protects itself against carcinomas by shedding its outer layer continuously. Furthermore, detoxification enzymes, such as cytochromes P450 have increased activities in the gut for protection from food-borne toxins. Thus, in most cases, small amounts of BaP are metabolized prior to being passed into the blood. The lungs are not protected in either of these manners.

The detoxification enzymes cytochrome P450 1A1 (CYP1A1) and cytochrome P450 1B1 (CYP1B1) are both protective and necessary for benzo[a]pyrene toxicity. Experiments with strains of mice engineered to remove (knockout) CYP1A1 and CYP1B1 reveal that CYP1A1 primarily acts to protect mammals from low doses of BaP, and that removing this protection accumulates large concentrations of BaP. Unless CYP1B1 is also knocked out, toxicity results from the bioactivation of BaP to benzo[a]pyrene -7,8-dihydrodiol-9,10-epoxide, the ultimate toxic compound,.

Interaction with DNA 

Properly speaking, BaP is a procarcinogen, meaning that its mechanism of carcinogenesis depends on its enzymatic metabolism to BaP diol epoxide It intercalates in DNA, and the electrophilic epoxide is attacked by nucleophilic guanine bases, forming a bulky guanine adduct.

X-ray crystallographic and nuclear magnetic resonance structure studies have shown how this binding distorts the DNA by confusing the double-helical DNA structure. This disrupts the normal process of copying DNA and causes mutations, which explains the occurrence of cancer after exposure. This mechanism of action is similar to that of aflatoxin which binds to the N7 position of guanine.

There are indications that benzo[a]pyrene diol epoxide specifically targets the protective p53 gene. This gene is a transcription factor that regulates the cell cycle and hence functions as a tumor suppressor. By inducing G (guanine) to T (thymidine) transversions in transversion hotspots within p53, there is a probability that benzo[a]pyrene diol epoxide inactivates the tumor suppression ability in certain cells, leading to cancer.

Benzo[a]pyrene-7,8-dihydrodiol-9,10-epoxide is the carcinogenic product of three enzymatic reactions:
 Benzo[a]pyrene is first oxidized by cytochrome P450 1A1 to form a variety of products, including (+)benzo[a]pyrene-7,8-epoxide.
 This product is metabolized by epoxide hydrolase, opening up the epoxide ring to yield (−)benzo[a]pyrene-7,8-dihydrodiol.
 The ultimate carcinogen is formed after another reaction with cytochrome P450 1A1 to yield the (+)benzo[a]pyrene-7,8-dihydrodiol-9,10-epoxide. It is this diol epoxide that covalently binds to DNA.

BaP induces cytochrome P450 1A1 (CYP1A1) by binding to the AHR (aryl hydrocarbon receptor) in the cytosol. Upon binding the transformed receptor translocates to the nucleus where it dimerises with ARNT (aryl hydrocarbon receptor nuclear translocator) and then binds xenobiotic response elements (XREs) in DNA located upstream of certain genes. This process increases transcription of certain genes, notably CYP1A1, followed by increased CYP1A1 protein production. This process is similar to induction of CYP1A1 by certain polychlorinated biphenyls and dioxins. Seemingly, CYP1A1 activity in the intestinal mucosa prevents major amounts of ingested benzo[a]pyrene to enter portal blood and systemic circulation. Intestinal, but not hepatic, expression of CYP1A1 depends on TOLL-like receptor 2 (TLR2), which is a eukaryotic receptor for bacterial surface structures such as lipoteichoic acid.

Moreover, BaP has been found to activate a transposon, LINE1, in humans.

Nucleotide excision repair
As illustrated above, (+)benzo[a]pyrene-7,8-dihydrodiol-9,10-epoxide (BPDE) forms bulky covalent DNA adducts with guanines. Most of these adducts can be efficiently eliminated from DNA by the process of nucleotide excision repair. Those adducts that are not removed can cause errors during DNA replication leading to carcinogenic mutations.

See also 
 Benzopyrene
 Benzo[e]pyrene
 Pyrene, a four-ring analogue
 Toxification

References

External links 
 
 National Pollutant Inventory – Polycyclic Aromatic Hydrocarbon Fact Sheet
 
 
 

IARC Group 1 carcinogens
Polycyclic aromatic hydrocarbons
PBT substances